André Costa (1927–2002) was a French writer and journalist.

He was the charismatic senior editor of  l'Auto-Journal from the creation of the newspaper (later reformatted as a magazine) in 1950, and road tested hundreds of cars, writing his road test reports with elegance and a level of insight which transformed that genre.

Costa's writing also celebrated his appetite for automobile expeditions and adventures, such as his drive to Chad in a Citroën SM, a trip he undertook in the remote Hoggar Mountains with a Citroën DS, participation in the Paris-Dakar Rally along with numerous automobile adventures that involved traversing parts of Europe.

Costa was also an historian, with a particular focus on the Second World War.    In addition to his pure history, he wrote an Alternate history novel, set in the Second World War and entitled L’Appel du 17 juin.

Bibliography 
 André Costa, Gérard Macchi, Peugeot : la marque au lion, Hirle Eds, 2011
Les roues libres, Paris, 1976.
L’Appel du 17 juin, Jean-Claude Lattès, Paris, 1980.

Motoring journalists
Motoring writers
Alternate history writers
1927 births
2002 deaths
French male novelists
20th-century French novelists
20th-century French male writers
20th-century French historians
French rally co-drivers
French male non-fiction writers